Lina Carstens (6 December 1892 in Wiesbaden – 22 September 1978 in Munich) was a German film and theater actress. On stage she appeared in plays by Gerhart Hauptmann, Arthur Schnitzler, and August Strindberg, and in her old age she starred in the film Lina Braake directed by Bernhard Sinkel.

Career
Carstens began her career as an actress before the First World War at the Court Theatre in Karlsruhe. It belonged to during the First World War and shortly thereafter the cabaret retort to the writer Ringelnatz to. She was married to the author Otto Ernst Sutter until his death in 1970.

In 1939 she was named a state actor by Joseph Goebbels. She played in Konstanz the first Mother Courage in the eponymous play by Bertolt Brecht on a German stage.

She began her film career 1922. The director Douglas Sirk gave her various leading roles.

After the Second World War she continued her career as a character actress. She also managed to get roles in the New German Cinema.

In the ZDF television series Der Bastian (1973) she had a role alongside Horst Janson and Karin Anselm. In 1972 she won the Film Award for her many years of service, in 1975 she was the same award for their outstanding performance in Lina Braake honored.

She also worked extensively as a voice actor and was dubbed over Margaret Rutherford (Passport to Pimlico), Françoise Rosay (Le Joueur) and Helene Thimig (Decision Before Dawn).

She received a burial at sea in the North Sea .

Selected filmography
 The Girl from the Marsh Croft (1935)
 To New Shores (1937)
 Tango Notturno (1937)
 The Broken Jug (1937)
 Heimat (1938)
 Passion (1940)
 The Eternal Spring (1940)
 My Daughter Doesn't Do That (1940)
 Commissioner Eyck (1940)
 A Gust of Wind (1942)
 The Green Salon (1942)
 Wedding in Barenhof (1942)
 Bluebeard (1951)
 My Name is Niki (1952)
 The Great Temptation (1952)
 Illusion in a Minor Key (1952)
 A Heart Plays False (1953)
 Secretly Still and Quiet (1953)
 Arlette Conquers Paris (1953)
  Fanfare of Marriage (1953)
 The Missing Miniature (1954)
 Fireworks (1954)
 Sky Without Stars (1955)
 Beloved Enemy (1955)
 My Husband's Getting Married Today (1956)
 Wir Wunderkinder (1958)
 I Was All His (1958)
 The Angel Who Pawned Her Harp (1959)
 Gustav Adolf's Page (1960)
 Das schwarze Schaf (1960)
 He Can't Stop Doing It (1962)
  (1968, TV miniseries)
 Der Bastian (1973, TV series, 13 episodes)
  (1974)
 Three Men in the Snow (1974)
 The Unguarded House (1975, TV film)
 Lina Braake (1975)
  (1976)
  (1977)
  (1978, TV film)
 The Rider on the White Horse (1978)

References

External links 
 

1892 births
1978 deaths
People from Wiesbaden
People from Hesse-Nassau
German film actresses
German stage actresses
German television actresses
20th-century German actresses
Best Actress German Film Award winners
Commanders Crosses of the Order of Merit of the Federal Republic of Germany